Clintonian may refer to:

 Clintonism, following the policies of American president Bill Clinton
 supporters of DeWitt Clinton (1769–1828), Governor of New York